Austromenopon is a genus of insects belonging to the family Menoponidae.

The genus was first described by Bedford in 1939.

The genus has cosmopolitan distribution.

Species:
 Austromenopon transversum (Denny, 1842)

References

Lice
Insect genera